Alberta Citylink was an airline based in Medicine Hat, Alberta, Canada. It operated domestic passenger service for Air Canada as an Air Canada Connector air carrier via a code sharing agreement. Its main base was Medicine Hat Airport, with a hub at Calgary International Airport

History 
The airline was established and initiated operations in 1996. Scheduled services were also operated by Bar XH Air (established in 1974) under the name Alberta Citylink.  However, scheduled services are no longer operated.

Air Canada Connector routes in 1999 
According to the Official Airline Guide (OAG), Alberta Citylink was operating Air Canada Connector code share services on behalf of Air Canada with BAe Jetstream commuter propjets at this time with nonstop flights between Calgary and Cold Lake, Alberta, Cranbrook, BC, Lethbridge, Lloydminster and Medicine Hat, and also nonstop between Edmonton and Cold Lake.

Fleet 
The Alberta Citylink fleet consisted of the following turboprop aircraft:
 1 - BAe Jetstream 31
 2 - BAe Jetstream 32

See also 
 List of defunct airlines of Canada

References 

Regional airlines of Alberta
Airlines established in 1996
Airlines disestablished in 2004
Medicine Hat
Companies based in Alberta
Defunct airlines of Canada
1996 establishments in Alberta
2004 disestablishments in Alberta